Nathaniel "Nate" Winkel (born June 30, 1978) is an American soccer midfielder who played professionally in the United States, Sweden and New Zealand.

Winkel came out of retirement in 2019 to join North Tam United in the Marin Over 40s League and made an immediate impact with his composure on the ball, efficient distribution, strong controlling presence in central midfield and perceptive half-time coaching.  

Winkel’s strong first season was capped off by being awarded the prestigious North Tam Player of the Season trophy for Summer 2019, as voted on by his teammates.

Youth
Winkel was born in Richfield, Minnesota, where he was a 1995 and 1996 All State High School soccer player; he graduated in 1996. He began his college career at the University of Maine in 1996 and 1997. He transferred to Marquette University for the 1998 and 1999 seasons. During the 1999 off-season, Winkel played for the Twin Cities Tornado of the USL Premier Development League.

Professional
In February 2000, the Minnesota Thunder selected Winkel in the first round of the USL A-League draft. In 2002, he moved to the Carolina Dynamo. He had spells in Sweden with Höllvikens GIF and Högaborgs BK. In 2004, he played for the Virginia Beach Mariners. In 2006, he rejoined the Thunder and played 13 matches for the team in the 2006 season. In 2010, Winkel played one game for Western Suburbs FC in New Zealand, but retired because of injuries. He is the executive director of the Ole Soccer Academy in Wellington.

References

1978 births
Living people
American soccer players
American expatriate soccer players
North Carolina Fusion U23 players
Maine Black Bears men's soccer players
Minnesota Thunder players
Soccer players from Minnesota
Twin Cities Phoenix players
USL First Division players
USL League Two players
Virginia Beach Mariners players
Högaborgs BK players
Association football midfielders